Empress Xiaokangzhang (1640 – 20 March 1663), of the Manchu Bordered Yellow Banner Tunggiya clan, was a posthumous name bestowed to the consort of Fulin, the Shunzhi Emperor, and mother of Xuanye, the Kangxi Emperor. She was honoured as Empress Dowager Cihe during the reign of her son and posthumously honoured as empress, although she never held the rank of empress consort during her lifetime.

Life

Family background
Empress Xiaokangzhang's personal name was not recorded in history. Her family originally belonged to the Han Chinese Plain Blue Banner. Although her family was of Jurchen descent, they had lived among Han Chinese for many generations and had been assimilated into Han Chinese society in Fushun, Liaoning, during the Ming dynasty, hence they were regarded as nikan (Han Chinese) by the Manchus and placed under a Han banner instead of a Manchu banner.

 Father: Tulai (1606–1658), served as a first rank military official, and held the title of a first class duke
 Paternal grandfather: Yangzhen (d. 1621)
 Mother: Lady Gioro
 Three brothers
 First younger brother: Guoji (国纪)
 Second younger brother: Guogang (国纲; d. 1690), served as a first rank military official (都统, pinyin: dutong) and held a title of first class duke (一等公)
 Third younger brother: Guowei (d. 1719), served as a  leader of imperial guards, and held the title of a first class duke, the father of Empress Xiaoyiren (d. 1689) and Imperial Noble Consort Quehui (1668–1743)

The Han Chinese Banner Tong 佟 clan of Fushun in Liaoning falsely claimed to be related to the Jurchen Manchu Tunggiya 佟佳 clan of Jilin, using this false claim to get themselves transferred to a Manchu banner in the reign of the Kangxi emperor.

Shunzhi era
In 1653, Lady Tong entered the Forbidden City and became a concubine of the Shunzhi Emperor. She never received any title or rank during his reign. On 4 May 1654, she gave birth to the emperor's third son, Xuanye.

Kangxi era
When the Shunzhi Emperor died on 5 February 1661, Xuanye was chosen to be the new emperor and was enthroned as the Kangxi Emperor. As the birth mother of the reigning emperor, Lady Tong was honoured as "Holy Mother, Empress Dowager Cihe".

Lady Tong died on 20 March 1663. Her death was reportedly due to an unknown illness but the circumstances surrounding her death were suspicious. Although she had never been Empress during the reign of the Shunzhi Emperor, she was granted the posthumous title "Empress Xiaokangzhang" by the Kangxi Emperor. She was interred in the Xiao Mausoleum alongside the Shunzhi Emperor and Consort Donggo.

Titles
 During the reign of Hong Taiji (r. 1626–1643):
 Lady Tong (from 1638)
 During the reign of the Kangxi Emperor (r. 1661–1722):
 Empress Dowager Cihe (from 5 February 1661)
 Empress Xiaokang (from June/July 1663)
 Empress Xiaokangzhang (from June/July 1670)

Issue
 As a concubine:
 Xuanye (4 May 1654 – 20 December 1722), the Shunzhi Emperor's third son, enthroned on 5 February 1661 as the Kangxi Emperor

In fiction and popular culture
 Portrayed by Chen Farong in The Duke of Mount Deer (2000)
 Portrayed by Zhu Yan in Kangxi Dynasty (2001)
 Portrayed by Jia Yumeng in Xiaozhuang Mishi (2003)

See also
 Ranks of imperial consorts in China#Qing
 Royal and noble ranks of the Qing dynasty

Notes

References
 
 
 
 
 
 

1638 births
1663 deaths
Qing dynasty empresses
Qing dynasty empresses dowager
17th-century Chinese women
17th-century Chinese people
Kangxi Emperor